Antonio Bonazza (1698 – c. 1762) was an Italian sculptor of the Rococo. 

Antonio was the son of Giovanni Bonazza, a prominent sculptor active in Padua (1654–1736), and member of a large family of sculptors. He may have been influenced by Orazio Marinali of Vicenza. Antonio is best known for his sculpture of genre themes, carved in local stone, suggesting characters from the theater for the formal gardens of  Villa Ludovico Widmann at Bagnoli near Padua. His genre subjects may have influenced F. A. Bustelli’s porcelain figures produced at Nymphenburg porcelain factory.

Sources
 ‘’La Vecchia’’

1698 births
1762 deaths
18th-century Italian sculptors
Italian male sculptors
18th-century Italian male artists